WREX (channel 13) is a television station in Rockford, Illinois, United States, affiliated with NBC. Owned by Allen Media Broadcasting, it is the market's only full-powered VHF station and is Rockford's second oldest television station. WREX's studios and transmitter are located on Auburn Road just west of Rockford.

History

WREX began operation on October 1, 1953, as a primary affiliate of CBS. It shared ABC with NBC affiliate WTVO, channel 17 (which signed on five months earlier), and also aired programming from the DuMont Television Network. It was owned by Greater Rockford Television, a group of local businessmen. The station's call letters were selected in honor of Rex N. Caster, the son of station president L. E. Caster. Rex Caster was a First Lieutenant in the United States Army who was killed in France during World War II.

Besides serving its immediate area, WREX attracted viewers early on in its history from parts of the neighboring Madison area. In fact, the two areas still share overlapping coverage among their television stations, especially in Rock County, Wisconsin (technically in the Madison television market), and that market's ABC affiliate, WKOW (channel 27) is a sister station to WREX, assisting with newsgathering in the northern part of the Rockford market. Until Madison's WISC-TV (channel 3) signed on in 1956, WREX was the only VHF station for both the Rockford and Madison areas. This was because Rockford and Madison were sandwiched between markets where other VHF channels were already assigned—Chicago (channels 2, 5, 7, 9, and 11) to the east; Milwaukee (channels 4, 6, 10, and 12) to the northeast; Davenport, Iowa–Rock Island, Illinois (Quad Cities) channels 4 and 6 (as well as 8 starting in August 1963) to the southwest; Cedar Rapids–Waterloo (channels 2, 7, and 9) to the west in eastern Iowa; and La Crosse–Eau Claire (channels 8 and 13) to the northwest, leaving room for only one VHF license in each market.

During the late 1950s, the station was also briefly affiliated with the NTA Film Network. The station lost DuMont when that network shut down in 1956. In 1963, the station was sold to the Gannett Company; during the mid-1960s, WREX was briefly co-owned with the Rockford Morning Star. WREX became a full-time ABC affiliate in 1965, when WCEE-TV signed on the air. In 1966, WREX became the first television station in Rockford to broadcast in color.

In 1969, Gannett sold WREX to the Gilmore Broadcasting Corporation, owner of WEHT in Evansville, Indiana. In 1987, Gilmore sold the station to ML Media Partners, L.P. In May 1995, Quincy Newspapers purchased WREX; the purchase was completed on July 31. Two weeks later, on August 14, WREX switched network affiliations with WTVO, taking that station's NBC affiliation while WTVO assumed WREX's old ABC affiliation. According to Variety, the affiliation switch was forced by ABC in retaliation for Quincy switching the affiliation of its South Bend station WSJV from ABC to Fox earlier that year.

On January 7, 2021, Quincy Media announced that it had put itself up for sale. A few weeks later, Gray Television announced it would purchase Quincy for $925 million. While Gray already owned WIFR-LD, the market's CBS affiliate, FCC regulations permit the common ownership of a full-power and a low-power station in a single market. However, on April 29, Gray announced that WREX would be divested to Allen Media Group in a $380 million deal that includes, among other Quincy-owned stations, WKOW, WXOW in La Crosse, and WQOW in Eau Claire. The deal is expected to close during the third quarter of 2021. Though Gray would not have any direct ownership or control of WREX, one caveat of Allen Media's deal to acquire the station includes a 10-year agreement to carry WIFR-LD on a WREX subchannel, which would give WIFR full-market coverage for the first time since it went to low-power status in 2017.

Programming

Syndicated programming
Syndicated programming on WREX includes The Doctors, Tamron Hall, Dr. Phil, Jeopardy!, and Wheel of Fortune, among others.

News operation
WREX airs more than 22 hours worth of newscasts a week, with  hours weekday mornings at 4:30; 30 minutes on weekdays at 11 a.m., 5, and 6; 35 minutes weekdays at 10; 30 minutes Saturdays at 6 and 10, and 30 minutes Sunday at 5 and 10.

WREX had a unique partnership with The Rockford Register Star, the city's daily newspaper. Staff of the newspaper would appear on WREX's news programs. In return, the newspaper promotes upcoming news stories and programming on Channel 13. WREX also has a partnership with Mid-West Family Broadcasting radio stations in the Rockford market. WREX provides weather reports for the stations and in return the radio stations provide promotion for WREX's programming.

WREX began to air newscasts in high-definition on December 12, 2010, the second in the Rockford market after WIFR and the third in the Quincy Newspapers station group after KWWL and WKOW.

Technical information

Subchannels
The station's digital signal is multiplexed:

WREX formerly operated Stateline CW, a digital broadcast affiliate of The CW Television Network via The CW Plus. Stateline CW is seen on channel 14 on DirecTV as well as most Rockford area cable systems. Stateline CW moved to WIFR-LD5 in 2021.

On April 4, 2013, WREX added MeTV, on digital subchannel 13.3. Subchannels 13.4 and 13.5 went on the air with color bars on April 30, 2019, with Justice Network launching on 13.5 on May 1, and Court TV on 13.4 a week later.

Analog-to-digital conversion
WREX shut down its analog signal, over VHF channel 13, at 12:30 p.m. on February 17, 2009, the original target date in which full-power television stations in the United States were to transition from analog to digital broadcasts under federal mandate (which was later pushed back to June 12, 2009). The station's digital signal relocated from its pre-transition UHF channel 54, which was among the high band UHF channels (52-69) that were removed from broadcasting use as a result of the transition, to its analog-era VHF channel 13 for post-transition operations.

See also
Channel 13 digital TV stations in the United States
Channel 13 virtual TV stations in the United States
Channel 14 branded TV stations in the United States

References

External links
 
13 Weather Authority Blog

NBC network affiliates
MeTV affiliates
Court TV affiliates
True Crime Network affiliates
Entertainment Studios
Television channels and stations established in 1953
REX
1953 establishments in Illinois